Telegino may refer to:

 Telegino, Oryol Oblast, a village in Oryol Oblast, Russia
 Telegino, Pskov Oblast, a village in Pskov Oblast, Russia
 Telegino, name of several other rural localities in Russia